"My Name is Billa" may refer to:

 The first song on the soundtrack of Billa (1980 film)
 The first song on the soundtrack of Billa (2007 film), a remix of the 1980 song
 The sixth song on the soundtrack of Billa (2009 film)